The American Association for Cancer Research (AACR) is the world's oldest and largest professional association related to cancer research. Based in Philadelphia, the AACR focuses on all aspects of cancer research, including basic, clinical, and translational research into the etiology, prevention, diagnosis, and treatment of cancer. Founded in 1907 by 11 physicians and scientists, the organization now has more than 52,000 members in 130 countries and territories. The mission of the AACR is to prevent and cure cancer through research, education, communication, collaboration, science policy and advocacy, and funding for cancer research.

History 
The AACR was founded on May 7, 1907, in Washington, D.C., as the "Association for Cancer Research" by a group of scientists consisting of four surgeons, five pathologists, and two biochemists. The founding members were Silas P. Beebe, George H. A. Clowes, William Coley, James Ewing, Harvey R. Gaylord, Robert B. Greenough, J. Collins Warren, George W. Crile, Leo Loeb, Frank Burr Mallory, and Ernest E. Tyzzer. They organized annual meetings to coincide with the meetings for the much larger meetings of the American Association of Pathologists and Bacteriologists. At the first meeting in New York City in November 1907, nine papers were presented. For the first 30 years, the group functioned as a select group of scientists, but with the expansion of cancer research in the 1930s, membership and interest grew. The society was officially incorporated in 1940.

Meetings and workshops

Annual Meeting
The AACR Annual Meeting attracts more than 21,000 participants from around the world and has been described as the "main forum to present and discuss cancer-related research." Attendees gather to discuss over 6,000 abstracts and to hear more than 250 invited presentations on significant discoveries in basic, clinical, and translational cancer research. Scientific award lectures, grant writing workshops, networking events, and educational sessions round out this comprehensive program.

Conferences and educational workshops 
In addition to the Annual Meeting, the AACR organizes approximately 30 other conferences and workshops each year, including:

 Smaller, more focused Special Conferences that are designed to share the latest advances in rapidly developing areas of cancer research;
 Larger International Conferences that recur on a regular basis, including collaborative programs such as the San Antonio Breast Cancer Symposium, Molecular Targets and Cancer Therapeutics Conference, the International Cancer Immunotherapy Conference, and the Biennial Meeting on Advances in Malignant Lymphoma;
 Educational Workshops that train early-career investigators in clinical trial design, molecular biology, integrative molecular epidemiology, translational research, and related fields.

Publications 

The AACR publishes ten peer-reviewed scientific journals: Blood Cancer Discovery, Cancer Discovery, Cancer Research, Clinical Cancer Research, Cancer Immunology Research, Molecular Cancer Therapeutics, Molecular Cancer Research, Cancer Prevention Research, Cancer Epidemiology, Biomarkers & Prevention and Cancer Research Communications. The AACR also publishes Cancer Today, a magazine for cancer patients, survivors, and their families and friends, as well as an Annual Report, and CR which aims to foster collaboration between cancer survivors, patient advocates, physicians and scientists.

Cancer Research
Cancer Research is the second most-frequently cited cancer journal in the world. Papers are peer-reviewed, and only those that meet high standards of scientific merit are accepted for publication. The journal publishes significant, original studies, reviews, and perspectives on all areas of basic, clinical, translational, epidemiological, and prevention research in cancer and the cancer-related biomedical sciences. Some of the topics include biochemistry; chemical, physical, and viral carcinogenesis and mutagenesis; clinical research including clinical trials; endocrinology; epidemiology and prevention; experimental therapeutics, molecular targets, and chemical biology; immunology and immunotherapy including biological therapy; molecular biology, pathobiology, and genetics; radiobiology and radiation oncology; cell and tumor biology; tumor microenvironment; systems biology and other emerging technologies.

Cancer Discovery
The AACR launched Cancer Discovery in 2011 as a selective journal for basic, translational, and clinical cancer research. Cancer Discovery has become a premier journal in the field of cancer research, with a 2020 impact factor of 39.397 that is the highest among the AACR journals. Research published in the journal includes identification of actionable genomic alterations in cancer, mechanisms of therapy resistance, clinical trials on targeted therapy, and cancer immunotherapy research including immune checkpoint blockade and Chimeric Antigen Receptor (CAR) T-cell therapy.

The AACR Foundation for the Prevention and Cure of Cancer
The AACR Foundation for the Prevention and Cure of Cancer is a 501(c)(3) public charity that provides financial support for scientific research, education, and communication. The foundation funds programs deemed by the AACR to be of the highest priority and impact in promoting research, supporting scientists, and raising awareness. Eighty-eight cents of every dollar raised by the AACR Foundation directly supports cancer research.

Cancer Evolution Working Group (CEWG)
Following the Cancer & Evolution Symposium in October 2020, organized by Frank H. Laukien, James A. Shapiro, Denis Noble, Henry Heng and Perry Marshall, this Working Group was integrated into the AACR to facilitate an interdisciplinary approach to the study of cancer. The group now presents the monthly Cancer Evolution Seminar Series.

Presidents 
The names of the presidents from 1907–1960 were reported by Triolo in 1961.

Funding programs 
Since establishing its grant program in 1993, the AACR has awarded more than $425 million in funding to more than 800 scientists for cancer research projects that aim to advance the understanding and treatment of cancer. AACR grants support researchers, both domestically and abroad, at every career stage, from fellowships to career development awards to major grants for independent investigators.

The AACR is the Scientific Partner of Stand Up To Cancer, a groundbreaking movement to accelerate innovative cancer research, get new therapies to patients quickly, and save lives.

Awards and Fellows 

The AACR honors scientists and clinicians who have made significant contributions to the understanding of the diagnosis, prevention and treatment of cancer through the presentation of 17 Scientific Achievement Awards and Lectureships.

The AACR Academy was established in 2013 to recognize and honor distinguished scientists whose major scientific contributions have propelled significant innovation and progress against cancer and advanced the mission of the AACR to prevent and cure all cancers through research, education, communication, and collaboration. A new class of Fellows of the AACR Academy is inducted each year at the AACR Annual Meeting.

See also
 Cancer
 Chemotherapy
 Experimental cancer treatments
 Radiation therapy

References

Further reading

External links
 

 
1907 establishments in the United States
Cancer organizations based in the United States
Medical and health organizations based in Pennsylvania